Miklós Erdődy de Monyorókerék et Monoszló (1630 – 7 June 1693) was a Croatian ban of Hungarian descent. He was a member of the Erdődy noble family and a Hungarian count.

He succeeded Petar Zrinski as ban in 1671. In 1684 he began his most notable undertaking, driving Ottoman forces out of Slavonia. Virovitica was liberated from the Ottoman rule in 1684. In 1688 the city of Kostajnica was liberated, and Slavonski Brod was liberated by 1691.

Erdődy died in 1693. However, his work was carried on by his successor Adam II. Batthyány. The wars against the Ottoman Empire throughout the region eventually led to the Treaty of Karlowitz in 1699.

References

Bans of Croatia
Miklos
1693 deaths
Year of birth unknown
1630 births